Mehdi Nassiri, professionally known as Mednas, is a DJ and producer originally from Casablanca, Morocco. He is the resident DJ of night club LIV at the Fontainebleau Miami Beach, FL. His track "Derby" with Nima Nesta was on the Beatport Top Ten chart and has been supported by EDM DJs such as Tiësto, Avicii, Erick Morillo, Roger Sanchez, Third Party, Junior Sanchez, and Morgan Page. His remix of Parker Ighile's "So Beautiful" with Henrix was supported by Nicki Minaj. Mednas specializes in tech house, progressive house and electro house.

Life and musical career

Early life and career 
Mednas, who derives his moniker from a mix-up of his given name, Mehdi Nassiri, was born in Casablanca and raised in Marrakesh and Tangier, Morocco.

Mednas always had an innate sense of music. He went to the conservatory at an early age to learn piano, but decided to teach it to himself, along with guitar. He replayed all of his favorite songs by ear. From that time on, he fell in love with music and started to learn about many musical genres, including Disco/Funk. His uncle was a big fan of 70's music, which inspired Mednas to take an interest in these two genres. Year after year, Mednas discovered more and more bands, artists and music styles, which helped him acquire a diverse musical background.

Mednas became exposed to the world of recording through his mother, who at that time was a sound engineer for the Moroccan Radio. He was known by his friends to always have the latest music, so they came to his house on a regular basis just to listen to it. That is where Mednas discovered the art of DJing. In 1996, he started DJing for fun and for his friends. Little by little, people started asking him to play at parties. Then, the word spread and clubs started to request him. Mednas ventured to Madrid, Spain at age 20 to pursue his studies, and spent seven years there. He was enrolled at Saint Louis University (Madrid Campus).

Mednas was an avid body boarder and almost went pro in the sport. He won many interschool championships, regional championships, and was a quarterfinalist in the Moroccan Championship. He was part of the Moroccan team in 2001, in which he represented Morocco in the ETB (European Tour of Body Boarding) in Portugal along with Adnane Benslimane. Mednas eventually stopped competing due to a triple fracture of his metatarsus while surfing in 2005, in addition to his studies and DJ career. However, he still surfs for fun on occasions.

To complete his degree in international business, Mednas transferred to Saint Louis University Main Campus in St. Louis, Missouri. In 2008, he moved to Miami, Florida to pursue his career in music.

Musical influences 
Mednas has always enjoyed listening to different genres of music. He incorporates these various music styles into his DJ sets. When he DJ's, he adapts his song choices to the crowd's energy and preferences.

Mednas lists his influences as Depeche Mode, Chaka Khan, Aretha Franklin, New Order, and Pearl Jam, among others.

Performances 
Throughout his world travels, Mednas has held residencies and spun at various venues. Living in Spain exposed Mednas to the professional side of DJing, where he spun at the most renowned clubs, such as Pacha, Arena, Cool Ballroom and more. In Morocco, he spun at Pacha, Nikki Beach and Morocco's International Festival of Essaouira, which gathered more than 30,000 people.

A couple years after moving to Miami, Mednas received a call from Erick Morillo asking him play at Arkadia for his Subliminal Sessions parties. Morillo was on the look out for a fresh new DJ, and Mednas fit the bill. He readily accepted the offer. These Subliminal Sessions soon moved to LIV, where Mednas is currently resident DJ. In Miami, Mednas has also played at venues such as Hed Kandi, Set, Mokai, Mansion, Story, and Wall.

Mednas’ performances have been shared with artists such as Tiësto, David Guetta, Dirty South, Swedish House Mafia, Paul Oakenfold, Fatboy Slim, Kaskade, Afrojack, Benny Benassi, Chuckie, Nicky Romero, Avicii, Erick Morillo, Dennis Ferrer, Moguai, Sander Kleinenberg, Felix Da Housecat, Luciano, Max Vangeli, Sander Van Doorn, Swanky Tunes, Alesso, Laidback Luke, Sunnery James & Ryan Marciano, and more.

Radio shows 
In addition to being solicited for club gigs, Mednas has participated in international radio shows, such as the Radio FG USA monthly residency, and Loca FM (Spain). A weekly show every Thursday on Revolution 93.5, is called "Mednas Madness".

Discography 
Singles
2013: Carlos Cid and Mednas – "Argan"
2013: Dean Cohen & Mednas – "Apex"
2014: CID & Mednas – "iLL Behavior", Size Records
Remixes
2014: Cedric Gervais featuring Coco – "Through the Night", Robbins Entertainment LLC
2017: Sunnery James & Ryan Marciano featuring Clara Mae – "The One That Got Away", SONO Music
2017: Sunnery James & Ryan Marciano featuring KEPLER – "Nobody Told Me", SONO Music
2017: CID featuring CeeLo Green – "Believer", Atlantic Records / Big Beat
2018: Moquai & AKA AKA – "Home" (Mednas & Nikola Remix), Axtone
2018: Sunnery James & Ryan Marciano featuring KEPLER – "Coffee Shop" (Mednas & Nikola Remix), SONO Music

References

External links
 Official website
 MednasMusic.com
 Beatport.com/Mednas
 Spotify.com/Mednas
 Mednas on Apple Music
 MednasTV - YouTube

Moroccan DJs
Moroccan record producers
Living people
People from Casablanca
People from Miami
Remixers
Electronic dance music DJs
Year of birth missing (living people)